Boston University School of Public Health (SPH) is one of the graduate schools of Boston University. Founded in 1976, the School offers master's- and doctoral-level programs in public health. It is located in the heart of Boston University's Medical Campus in the South End neighborhood of Boston, Massachusetts.  The school has more than 8,900 alumni, 267 faculty, and 227 staff; its students hail from more than 43 countries, and its total research portfolio is worth more than $180 million. BUSPH is fully accredited by the Council on Education for Public Health and ranked 6th among Public Health Graduate Schools by U.S. News & World Report.

The current dean is Sandro Galea. Former dean Robert Meenan stepped down at the end of 2014 after serving in the role for 22 years.

Mission

"The mission of the Boston University School of Public Health is to improve the health of local, national, and international populations—particularly the disadvantaged, underserved, and vulnerable—through excellence and innovation in education, research, and service."

History
The school was established in 1976 as a program within the Department of Socio-Medical Sciences and Community Medicine with an initial class of 54 MPH students and 20 non-degree students. It was the brainchild of Dr. Douglas K. Decker, who designed its admission criteria (successful healthcare managers and practitioners), curriculum (practical, rather than theoretical), teaching approach (pairing academicians and accomplished practitioners in the field), and schedule (night classes only held on Tuesday, Wednesday, and Thursday so that working medical professionals could attend.) The first dean was Dr. Norman A. Scotch, who guided the school through the accreditation process and who "developed a program that offered professionals the opportunity to continue working while they earned their degrees in Public Health."

In 1977, 59 part-time students were admitted to the MPH program. There were two concentrations: Health Delivery Systems, and Health Research and Evaluation. Two new concentrations were added in 1978, Health Regulation and Planning, and Public Health Law.

On June 26, 1979, BUSPH became an official school of Boston University, matriculating 156 students and offering afternoon courses for the first time. It had five programs: Environmental Health, Health Care Systems, Public Health Law, Research and Evaluation, and Social and Behavioral Sciences. That same year the first graduation ceremony was held for 46 graduates.

In 1981, the school expanded to include the departments of Epidemiology and Biostatistics. It also began accepting full-time students and enrolled its first international students. The International Health department was created the following year. In 1983, the School received its full accreditation by the Council on Education for Public Health.

The Office of Special Projects was established in 1985 to provide education and training in international health and to conduct overseas and domestic research and service programs. This Office later became the Center for International Health, which housed the Department of International Health. The following year the first doctoral student graduated.

Dr. Robert Meenan assumed BUSPH's leadership in 1993. The school experienced significant growth during his 22 years as dean, matriculating 370 MPH students in 2012, moving to its current location in the historic Talbot Building, and instituting a practicum requirement for MPH students.

In 2015, the current dean Dr. Sandro Galea joined BUSPH. The school became a top 10 school of public health in the United States that same year. In 2016, under the leadership of the Dean of Education Lisa Sullivan, the School introduced a new MPH program, featuring a core curriculum, interdisciplinary certificates, and professional development and practical education throughout the curriculum.

Granted Degrees 
Boston University School of Public Health grants the following degrees:
Master of Public Health (MPH)
Master of Arts (MA)
Master of Science 
Doctor of Philosophy (PhD)
Doctor of Public Health

Dual Degrees 
Dual degree programs are also available with other schools at Boston University.  The dual degree typically allows the student to finish both degrees in less time than if the degrees were attempted separately.  BUSPH offers dual degrees with the following schools:
Boston University Graduate School of Management (MPH/MBA)
Boston University School of Law (MPH/JD)
Boston University School of Medicine (MD/MPH)
Division of Graduate Medical Sciences (MPH/MA)
Boston University School of Social Work (MPH/MSW)
Sargent College of Health and Rehabilitation Sciences (BS/MPH)
College of Arts and Sciences (BA/MPH)

Rankings 
U.S. News & World Report ranks the Boston University School of Public Health 6th in the U.S. among public health graduate schools. The school received a rating of 4.2 out of 5 based on a survey of academics at peer institutions.  According to Shanghai Ranking, Boston University is ranked among the top 20 best schools in the world in the field of public health.

Research 
Boston University School of Public Health's research portfolio is one of the largest at BU, the fourth largest research university in the country. Four broad areas of research focus represent the work of the school: urban living, gaining and well-being, health across the life-course, and health systems. Notable studies include:
 Framingham Heart Study, a long-term, ongoing cardiovascular study on residents of the town of Framingham, Massachusetts, which has been cited in over 1,000 medical papers since it began in 1948.
 Black Women's Health Study, funded by the National Institutes of Health, began in 1995 and follows a cohort of the 59,000 women who enrolled. The study focuses on the drivers of cancer and other diseases among African-American women.
 Drunk driving and alcohol policy studies by BUSPH faculty developed the research base for nationwide legislation related to drunk driving laws. More recently, findings have shown clear links between state alcohol policies and rates of drunk driving.
 Research Advisory Committee on Gulf War Veterans’ Illnesses, directed by BUSPH, examines the underlying causes and potential treatments of gulf war syndrome.
 Gun violence studies, including a study linking state-level gun restrictions and violence, a study on how restrictive state gun policies lower young people's access to guns, and a study showing that states with higher estimated rates of gun ownership experienced a higher incidence of non-stranger firearms homicides.
 Obesity paradox study, showing that past research on obesity's link to mortality was flawed because the research used a one-time measure of an individual's weight rather than looking at weight changes over time.
 Substance Use studies, including showing that patients who use marijuana have lower odds of achieving abstinence from other drugs and alcohol, that recreational drug use on weekends often turns into more frequent use, and that benzodiazepines increase the risk of opioid overdose.
 New England Centenarian Study, one of the oldest such studies in the world, explores the reasons why some people reach very advanced ages and others do not, including genetics and lifestyle factors. 
 Electronic cigarettes studies, making the initial determination that e-cigarettes are a less harmful alternative to smoking.

Notable alumni and faculty
 Kathleen Carey, health economist and professor
 Elizabeth Cohen, MPH '92, CNN Medical Reporter
 Karen Daley MPH ’88, President, American Nurses Association 
 Sarah Degnan Kambou MPH ’84, President, International Center for Research on Women 
 Natalie Dell, MPH '08, US Olympic medalist
 Howard Koh, MPH '05 Former Massachusetts Commissioner of Public Health; United States Assistant Secretary for Health (U.S. Department of Health and Human Services) 
 Ali Noorani MPH ’99, Executive Director, National Immigration Forum 
 Gigi Tsereteli, MPH '05 Member of Parliament of Georgia
 Alexa Beiser, professor of biostatistics

References

External links
Boston University School of Public Health

School of Public Health
Medical and health organizations based in Massachusetts
Schools of public health in the United States
Educational institutions established in 1976
1976 establishments in Massachusetts